Dawnbird is an album by saxophonist Vincent Herring which was released on Orrin Keepnews' Landmark label in 1993.

Reception

The AllMusic review by Ron Wynn stated "Alto saxophonist Vince Herring has steadily developed his own tart, bluesy sound ... There is more spark, ambition and drive in his playing on this release than any previous date; he tries new things on each number and isn't afraid to stretch out ... by far his best release".

Track listing
All compositions by Vincent Herring except where noted
 "Sound Check" – 8:15
 "August Afternoon" (Mulgrew Miller) – 6:33
 "Almost Always" – 8:53
 "Toku Do" (Buster Williams) – 6:40
 "Dawnbird" (Mike Nock) – 6:15
 "Dr. Jamie" – 5:20
 "Who's Kidding Who?" – 9:08
 "Dark Side of Dewey" (Carl Allen) – 7:00

Personnel
Vincent Herring - alto saxophone, soprano saxophone
Wallace Roney (tracks 1-5), Scott Wendholt (tracks 6-8) – trumpet 
Kevin Hays (tracks 6-8), Mulgrew Miller (tracks 1-5) – piano
Dwayne Burno (tracks 6-8), Ira Coleman (tracks 1-5) – bass 
Carl Allen (tracks 6-8), Billy Drummond (tracks 1-5) – drums

References

Landmark Records albums
Vincent Herring albums
1993 albums
Albums produced by Orrin Keepnews